The LG KE850, also known as the LG Prada, is a touchscreen mobile phone made by LG Electronics. It was first announced on December 12, 2006 and was created in collaboration with Italian luxury designer Prada. It was made official in a press release on January 18, 2007. Sales started in May 2007, retailing for about $777 (600 euros).

It is the first mobile phone with a capacitive touchscreen. The KE850 sold 1 million units in the first 18 months. A second version of the phone, the LG Prada II (KF900) was released December 2008.

The LG Prada was announced shortly before Apple CEO Steve Jobs announced the iPhone on January 9, 2007. After the release of the iPhone the head of the LG Mobile Handset R&D Center was quoted saying he believed Apple had stolen the idea from the KE850 after it was announced as part of the iF Design Award.

Specifications 
Source:

General
Form factor: Touchscreen
Dimensions: 98.8 × 54 × 12 mm
Weight: 85 g
Main screen type: Capacitive TFT touchscreen, 256K colors
Main screen size/resolution: 240 × 400 pixels, 3 inches
Messaging: SMS, EMS, MMS, Email
Operating system: Flash UI
Built-in handsfree: Yes
Voice-dial/memo: Yes
Vibration: Yes
Organiser: Yes
Office document viewer: .ppt, .doc, .xls, .pdf, .txt
Battery stand-by: Up to 300 h
Battery talk time: Up to 3 h

Connectivity
2G network: GSM 900 / 1800 / 1900 (tri-band)
Bluetooth: v2.0 with A2DP
USB: v2.0

Multimedia
2MP camera: 2 MP, 1600×1200 pixels, video (CIF 30 frame/s), flash
Internal memory: 8 MB shared memory
Memory slot: microSD (TransFlash), up to 2 GB
Games: Halloween Fever, Photo Puzzle, Virus, Pipe
Music: MP3 player
Radio: Yes
Ringtones: Polyphonic (40 channels), MP3
Speakers: Built-in handsfree

Awards 
 International Forum Design—Product Design Award for 2007
 Red dot design award—LG Prada Wins "Best of the Best" red dot Design Award, 2007
 Fashion phone of the year—Mobile Choice (2007)
 Best fashion phone—What Mobile Awards (2007)
 Gold for best looking phone—CNET Asia Readers' Choice Award (2007/08)

See also 
LG Prada II (KF900), the second LG Prada phone
LG Prada 3.0 (P940), the third LG Prada phone
LG Viewty
LG Chocolate
iPhone (1st generation)
Samsung P520 Giorgio Armani
Motorola Razr2

References 

KE850
Portable media players
Prada